Trimeroceratidae is a family of molluscs in the order Oncocerida. These molluscs were fast-moving nektobenthic carnivores. They lived in the Silurian period.

Distribution

Species have been found in Silurian-era strata of Canada (Québec), China, Czechia, Italy, Russia, Sweden, and the United States (Indiana, Wisconsin).

Genus
 Clathroceras
 Eotrimeroceras
 Inversoceras
 Jeppssonoceras
 Patagiumoceras
 Pentameroceras
 Plemeroceras
 Simonssoceras
 Stenogomphoceras
 Trimeroceras

See also
List of nautiloids

References
Paleobiology Database

Oncocerida
Prehistoric cephalopod families
Silurian first appearances
Silurian extinctions